Port Sudan is a district of Red Sea state, Sudan.

References

Districts of Sudan